Neoparadoxia is an extinct genus of large, herbivorous aquatic desmostylian mammals from the Miocene Ladera and Monterey Formations of North America.

References

Desmostylians
Tortonian life
Prehistoric placental genera
Miocene mammals of North America
Paleontology in California
Fossil taxa described in 2013